Gerald Horne (born January 3, 1949) is an American historian who holds the John J. and Rebecca Moores Chair of History and African American Studies at the University of Houston.

Background
Gerald Horne was raised in St. Louis, Missouri. After his undergraduate education at Princeton University, he received his Ph.D. from Columbia University and a J.D. from the University of California, Berkeley.

Career
Horne holds the John J. and Rebecca Moores Chair of History and African American Studies at the University of Houston.

He is a frequent contributor to Political Affairs magazine and guest on Radio Sputnik.

Writing

Horne has published on W. E. B. Du Bois and has written books on neglected episodes of world history. He writes about topics he perceives as misrepresented struggles for justice, in particular communist struggles and struggles against imperialism, colonialism, fascism, racism, and white supremacy. A Marxist, individuals whose lives his work has highlighted in their historical contexts have included the blacklisted Hollywood screenwriter John Howard Lawson, Ferdinand Smith (a Jamaican-born communist, sailor, labor leader, and co-founder of the National Maritime Union), and Lawrence Dennis, an African American fascist and racist who passed for white.

While many of Horne's books use a celebrated, intriguing or politically engaged individual as a prism to inspect the historical forces of their times, Horne has also produced broad canvas chronicles of infrequently examined periods and aspects of the history of white supremacy and imperialism such as the post-civil war involvement of the US ruling class—newly dispossessed of human chattels—with slavery in Brazil, which was not legally abolished until 1888, or the attempts by Japanese imperialists in the mid-20th century to appear as the leaders of a global war against white supremacy, thus allies and instruments of "liberation" for people of color oppressed by imperialism.

Manning Marable has said: "Gerald Horne is one of the most gifted and insightful historians on racial matters of his generation."

Historiography in and for the radical tradition
At the Black Women and the Radical Tradition conference held at the Brooklyn College Graduate Center for Worker Education, in a session devoted to Shirley Graham Du Bois, he said:

In a speech given at an event marking the depositing of the Communist Party USA archives at the Tamiment Library at New York University, Horne remarked at length on the writing of history, its importance, and what he perceives as the grievous proliferation of propagandistic historiography in the US:

From 2013 to date, Horne has discussed his historical, socio-economic and political research findings in a series of conversations with Paul Jay.

Works

 Black and Red: W.E.B. Du Bois and the Afro-American Response to the Cold War. SUNY Press (1986)
 Communist Front? The Civil Rights Congress, 1946-1956. Farleigh Dickinson University Press (1987)
 Black Liberation/Red Scare: Ben Davis and the Communist Party. University of Delaware Press (1994)
 Fire This Time: The Watts Uprising And The 1960s. Da Capo Press (1997)
 From the Barrel of a Gun: The United States and the War against Zimbabwe, 1965-1980. University of North Carolina Press (2000)
 Class Struggle in Hollywood, 1930-1950 : Moguls, Mobsters, Stars, Reds and Trade Unionists. University of Texas Press (2001)
 Race Woman: The Lives of Shirley Graham Du Bois. NYU Press (2002)
 
 Black and Brown: African Americans and the Mexican Revolution, 1910-1920. NYU Press (2005)
 The Final Victim of the Blacklist: John Howard Lawson, Dean of the Hollywood Ten. University of California Press (2006)
 Cold War in a Hot Zone: The United States Confronts Labor and Independence Struggles in the British West Indies. Temple University Press (2007)
 The White Pacific: U.S. Imperialism and Black Slavery in the South Seas After the Civil War. University of Hawaii Press (2007)
 The Deepest South: The United States, Brazil, and the African Slave Trade. NYU Press (2007)
 Blows Against the Empire: U.S. Imperialism in Crisis. International Publishers (2008)
 Red Seas: Ferdinand Smith and Radical Black Sailors in the United States and Jamaica. NYU Press (2009)
 Mau Mau in Harlem?: The U.S. and the Liberation of Kenya. Palgrave MacMillan (2009)
 The Color of Fascism: Lawrence Dennis, Racial Passing, and the Rise of Right-Wing Extremism in the United States. NYU Press (2009)
 W.E.B. Du Bois: A Biography. Greenwood Press (2009)
 The End of Empires: African Americans and India. Temple University Press (2009)
 Fighting in Paradise: Labor Unions, Racism, and Communists in the Making of Modern Hawaii. University of Hawaii Press. (2011)
 Negro Comrades of the Crown: African Americans and the British Empire Fight the U.S. Before Emancipation. NYU Press. (2013)
 Black Revolutionary: William Patterson & the Globalization of the African American Freedom Struggle. University of Illinois Press (2013)
 The Counter-Revolution of 1776: Slave Resistance and the Origins of the United States of America. NYU Press (2014)
 Race to Revolution: The U.S. and Cuba during Slavery and Jim Crow. Monthly Review Press (2014)
 Confronting Black Jacobins:  The U.S., the Haitian Revolution and the Origins of the Dominican Republic. Monthly Review Press (2015)
 Paul Robeson:  The Artist as Revolutionary. Pluto Press (2016)
 The Rise and Fall of the Associated Negro Press: Claude Albert Barnett's Pan-African News and the Jim Crow Paradox. University of Illinois Press (2017)
 Storming the Heavens:  African Americans and the Early Struggle for the Right to Fly. Black Classic Press (2017)
 Facing the Rising Sun:  African Americans, Japan the Rise of Afro-Asian Solidarity. NYU Press (2018)
 The Apocalypse of Settler Colonialism: The Roots of Slavery, White Supremacy, and Capitalism in Seventeenth-Century North America and the Caribbean. Monthly Review Press (2018)
 Jazz and Justice: Racism and the Political Economy of the Music. Monthly Review Press (2019)
 White Supremacy Confronted: U.S. Imperialism and Anti-Communism vs. the Liberation of Southern Africa from Rhodes to Mandela. International Publishers (2019)
 The Dawning of the Apocalypse: The Roots of Slavery, White Supremacy, Settler Colonialism, and Capitalism in the Long Sixteenth Century. Monthly Review Press (2020)
 The Bittersweet Science: Racism, Racketeering, and the Political Economy of Boxing. International Publishers (2020)
 The Counter-Revolution of 1836:  Texas Slavery & Jim Crow and the Roots of U.S. Fascism. International Publishers (2022)

See also
 Black and Brown: African Americans and the Mexican Revolution, 1910-1920

Footnotes

External links

 University of Houston faculty page
 
 Recorded speeches and interviews
 
 On The Global Civil Rights Struggle at the conference, The Long Civil Rights Movement: Histories, Politics, Memories, given by the Southern Oral History Program, April 2–4, 2009 (Video)
 On Shirley Graham Du Bois at the Graduate Center for Worker Education at Brooklyn College (Video)
 On the Red Scare and the Hollywood Blacklist on NPR
 Horne challenges the mainstream narrative of US history (August 2014). Six-part discussion, The Real News (all TRNN segments)
 "Counter-Revolution of 1776": Was U.S. Independence War a Conservative Revolt in Favor of Slavery? on Democracy Now!, June 27, 2014
 The Summit of the Americas in the Context of US Imperialism (April 2015). "Scholar and activist Gerald Horne traces modern-day US foreign policy in Latin America to its colonial roots." The Real News
 Police Killings Won't Stop Until U.S. Comes to Grips with its Racist Foundations The Real News. July 8, 2016.
 Historian: "You Can't Disconnect History of the 2nd Amendment From the History of White Supremacy" on Democracy Now!, July 12, 2016 (all DN! segments)
Appearances on On the Ground radio show

1949 births
Living people
African-American academics
Black studies scholars
African-American writers
Historians of communism
American political writers
Marxist theorists
American Marxist historians
American male non-fiction writers
Anti-imperialism
Historians of colonialism
Labor historians
21st-century American historians
21st-century American male writers
Princeton University alumni
Columbia University alumni
UC Berkeley School of Law alumni